Jean Salamé is a former French slalom canoeist who competed in the early 1980s. He won a silver medal in the C-1 team event at the 1981 ICF Canoe Slalom World Championships in Bala.

References

French male canoeists
Living people
Year of birth missing (living people)
Medalists at the ICF Canoe Slalom World Championships